WOMX-FM (105.1 MHz) is a commercial radio station licensed to Orlando, Florida. The station is owned by Audacy, Inc. and airs a hot adult contemporary radio format known as Mix 105.1. WOMX-FM's studios and offices are located on Pembrook Drive in Maitland and the transmitter tower is off Fort Christmas Road in Bithlo. The transmitter is shared with WRUM, WJRR and WTKS-FM.

WOMX-FM operates with 100,000 watts and covers much of the Eastern region of Central Florida, from Palm Coast to the north, Lakeland to the west and Palm Bay to the south. On certain days, the signal can reach as far as Tampa Bay.

History
105.1 FM first signed on the air on August 15, 1967 as WWQS. It was co-owned with WVCF (1480 AM) in Windermere. In 1973, American Homes Stations sold WWQS to Rounsaville Radio, owner of WBJW (1440 AM) in Winter Park, which changed the call letters to WBJW-FM, with the FM as a contemporary hits station and the AM airing an easy listening format. 105.1 was sold to Nationwide Communications in 1982, then Omni American and then to Shamrock Broadcasting in 1996, Chancellor Media in 1997 (which would subsequently merge with AMFM and then Clear Channel), then to Infinity Radio (CBS) in 2000. On February 2, 2017, CBS Radio announced it would merge with Entercom. The merger was approved on November 9, 2017, and was consummated on the 17th.

The station began broadcasting as WOMX-FM on September 14, 1989, with the call letters standing for Orlando's MiX.  (WOMX was formerly the call sign for a Coast Guard ship based in Biloxi, Mississippi.)  Initially, Mix 105.1's format was characterized as "Adult Top 40", but was quickly modified to a slightly more mature "Hot Adult Contemporary" sound, with a greater emphasis on hits from the past two decades.

The station signed on with Mike Elliot and Beth Ann Schaffer in mornings, Tracey Young in middays, Dave Kelly in afternoons, and Nick Sanders ("Nick At Night") in the evening slot. Overnights were hosted by Keith Summers. The station was first programmed by Brian Thomas, now PD of WCBS-FM in New York City. In late 1990, the station launched the morning show Scott and Erica in the Morning, with Scott McKenzie and Erica Lee, after Mike Elliott left for a job in Tampa.

Longtime morning show co-host Erica Lee was fired January 7, 2010 after 19 years at WOMX-FM. Scott remained as the anchor and face of WOMX-FM's morning show, joined by Dana Taylor and Jay Edwards.  Following a move to more rhythmic content on CBS Radio-owned hot AC stations (WBMX Boston, WQAL Cleveland and WTIC-FM Hartford), WOMX-FM began adding more rhythmic music to go up against Top 40 station WXXL, owned by Clear Channel Communications (now iHeart). Ratings had been up for WOMX-FM after the playlist tweak, and also caused rival soft adult contemporary station WMGF to phase in more hot AC content.

WOMX-FM is the oldest hot adult contemporary in Florida under CBS Radio/Entercom/Audacy ownership, while CBS Radio's other hot ACs (WHFS-FM Tampa and WPBZ West Palm Beach) had the format since 2010 and 2011, respectively. As of July 2014, those stations have switched formats, with WHFS-FM flipping to sports radio (as well as being sold to Beasley Broadcast Group), and WPBZ sold to a new owner and flipping to country music. That made WOMX-FM not only the oldest Hot AC station in Florida under CBS Radio/Entercom/Audacy ownership, but once again, CBS Radio's only Florida Hot AC station.

On August 11, 2015, morning host Scott McKenzie died at the age of 59 after suffering from non-Hodgkin lymphoma for seven years. Mornings are now hosted by Dana Taylor and "Jenn", known as "Mix Mornings".

In early 2020, older songs from the 2000s and 2010s were added back to the playlist, as well as select 1990s tracks that don't overlap with sister station WOCL.

In mid-November 2021, Jay Edwards announced his departure from the station. As of May 2022, he has since joined CMG Orlando as an on-air producer and host of talk radio station WDBO, country radio station WWKA, and classic rock station WMMO. In January 2023, Dana Taylor announced her departure from the station, with her last appearance being on January 13. She had been working at this station since 1994. Prior to that, she served as music director at WFSY in Panama City from 1990 to 1994.

HD programming

WOMX-FM also carried an information service for Orlando International Airport on its HD2 subchannel, known as Fly MCO Radio ('MCO' being the airport's IATA code) from 2016 until 2019. The HD signal rebranded as "Orlando Vacation Radio", while maintaining the same format, which overlapped with some of its main station's playlist, along with most of WOCL's as well. Prior to that, 105.1 HD2 previously carried a Top 40/CHR music format, branded as "105.1 AMP Radio", then tweaked to Rhythmic AC as "NOW 105.1 HD2" in mid-2013.

As of November 2019, "Orlando Vacation Radio" was discontinued, along with the online stream being dormant on the Radio.com app. A few days later, the HD2 station switched over to "Channel Q", which was supposed to launch in Orlando during mid-August 2019 on sister station WQMP. At some point in early-to-mid 2020, the HD2 channel was pulled, with "Channel Q" moving to WQMP's HD3 subchannel, but in January 2022, Channel Q returned to WOMX's HD2 subchannel, with WQMP's HD3 subchannel becoming a secondary feed for Audacy's New Arrivals.

References

External links

OMX-FM
Hot adult contemporary radio stations in the United States
Radio stations established in 1967
1967 establishments in Florida
Audacy, Inc. radio stations
Orlando International Airport